Sarita Joshi (née Bhosle) (born October 17, 1941) is an Indian actress. Cited amongst the finest and most significant actors of Gujarati and Marathi theatre, Joshi is known for her Gujarati plays done with her husband Pravin Joshi in the 1970s. She garnered widespread recognition for her role as the matriarch Godavari Thakkar in the Star Plus hit dramedy Baa Bahoo Aur Baby (2005-2010).  In 2020, she was honoured with the Padma Shri, the fourth highest civilian award, by the Government of India for her contribution to arts.  In 1988, she was awarded the Sangeet Natak Akademi Award for Acting in Gujarati by the Sangeet Natak Akademi, India's National Academy of Music, Dance & Drama. In 2020, she has been awarded with Padma Shri, India's fourth highest civilian award for her contribution in Art. She was recently seen in (2019) Zee TV's Hamari Bahu Silk as a hard-working business woman who hates films especially 'A' grade films . Sarita Joshi is currently seen on Anupama: Namaste America a prequel  web series to Star Plus show  Anupamaa. 

She is currently playing the character of Radha Limaye aka Radha Tai/Kaku in Sony Sab's Pushpa Impossible.

Early life
Sarita was born in a middle class Marathi family in Pune, though she grew up in Vadodara. Her father, Bhimrao Bhosle, was a barrister and mother, Kamlabai Rane, was from Goa. She began acting on stage at the age of nine along with her sister Padmarani, due to financial problems that her family found itself in. Though she started with traditional theatre, she soon started working with noted artists like Shanta Apte. She is often confused with her sister, Padmarani, who is also an actress.

Career
After working as child actor for six years, Joshi got her first lead role at age 16. She went to act with Indian National Theatre Gujarati, and it was here that she met her future husband Pravin Joshi.

She made television debut in the 1980s, with the TV series, Titliyan (Butterflies), directed by Nadira Babbar, followed by numerous series in the 90s, including, Zee TV's Zee TV's Hasratein. She is best known for portraying Baa aka Godavari Labhshankar Thakkar a tough yet fair and loving matriarch in the household hit serial Baa Bahoo Aur Baby in which she was cast opposite a renowned theatre, film and television actor Arvind Vaidya with whom she also did the play named Masala Mami, which stopped on 28 March 2009 for a temporary seasonal break, but was renewed on popular demand. It is a popular show among masses and is still loved by the audience and are waiting for its next season. It ran for five years on television owing to its cast, storyline and performances. In 2009, Joshi played in the serial Kuchh Kook Hota Hai as Rani on 9X. Joshi played Asha Parekh's friend in the movie Kanyadaan in 1968 and also appeared in the song "Mil Gaye Milgaye Aaj Mere Sanam" from the same film. Joshi played Vijayanthimala's friend in the movie Pyar Hi Pyar in 1969. She also portrayed Abhishek Bachchan's mother in Guru, directed by filmmaker Mani Ratnam. She also played a central character in the 2008 movie Dasvidaniya. Joshi then travelled to the United States that year to be part of the crossover film, Bollywood Beats, starring alongside Lilette Dubey and Pooja Kumar, in a film directed by Mehul Shah. Out of all the mediums, she holds a special corner for theatre and stage performances. She claims that the joy of performing on stage is any time better than anything else and that theatre will always be her first love.

She stars in Star Plus' Chand Chupa Badal Mein, which is produced by Rajan Shahi as the caring, confident grandmother of female lead Nivedita, played by Neha Sargam. Her film Gangoobai has been released in theatres in January 2013 in which she plays the protagonist. She appeared in Meri Aashiqui Tumse Hi in 2015 as female lead (Radhika Madan's) grandmother aka Hansa Govardhan Parekh. She was also seen playing the character of Lalita Swamy "Amma" and as "daadi maa"in the episodic story 9 saal ki dadi maa in Sab TV's serial Khidki. She played the character of Bakula - the lead role in the &TV serial Bakula Bua Ka Bhoot in 2017.She also played cameo as Champa Kaki in (2005-2006) Star Plus's Khichdi Returns.

She played the character of Subhadra in the Colors TV show Silsila Badalte Rishton Ka (2018). She was seen in Zee TV's Hamari Bahu Silk (2019) in pivotal role as Aruna Parekh aka Baa— a wealthy and hardworking business woman who hates films especially 'A' grade films, she was also reunited with her onscreen son (Subodh) played by Rajesh Kumar in Baa Bahoo Aur Baby after 9 years on television.

Personal life
Joshi was first married to Rajkumar Khatau. Later, she married theatre director and playwright Pravin Joshi. She is the mother of actresses Ketki Dave, who played the role of Daksha in Kyunki Saas Bhi Kabhi Bahu Thi and of Purbi Joshi, who appears on Comedy Circus as a host. Aruna Irani is her sister's niece from husband side. Her niece is Manasi Joshi Roy (wife of Rohit Roy) and nephew is actor Sharman Joshi (son in law of Prem Chopra), son of theatre veteran Arvind Joshi.

Plays

 Ame Paranyaa (1948-50)
Aaj ni Vaat (1948-50)
 Dil ki Pyaas, Aankh ka Nasha
 Ra Mandalik
 Malavpati Munj
 Prithvi Raaj Chauhan
 Kuleen Kanya
 Bal Kanaiyo
 Gunhegaar
 Inquilaab (Hindi)
Anokhi Pooja
 Mangal Moorty
 Jojo Moda Na Padaota (1962)
 Prithvi Vallabh
 Saccha Bola Jutha Laga
 Balwant ni Baby
 Moti Veraana Chok ma
 Mograna Saap (1963)
 Chandarvo (1963)
 Saptapadi
 Veni Ma Char Phool
 Evam Indrajit
 Dhummas
 Sapna na Vavetar
 Sahebo Gulab no Chod
Kaanch no Chandramaa
 Vaishaki Koyal
 Sharat
 Manju Manju
 Santu Rangili (1973)
 Kumarni Agashi (1975)
 Mausam Chalke
 Lady Lalkunwar
 Savita Damodar Paranjpe
 Do Diwane Shaher Mein
 Devaki
 Masala Mami (Gujarati)– with Arvind Vaidya and Disha Vakani in the cast
 Avsar Aavi ne Ubho Aangane
 Sakubai (Hindi)
 Shyamchi Aai (Marathi)

Filmography

Television

Films

Web series

Awards

In 2020, the Government of India honoured her with the Padma Shri, the fourth highest civilian award in the Republic of India.
In 1988, she was awarded the Sangeet Natak Akademi Award for Acting in Gujarati. In 2007, for her role as Godavari Labhshankar Thakkar in Baa Bahoo Aur Baby, she was awarded a Best Actress in a Drama award by the IDEA Indian Television Academy Awards.

Other awards include:

 Lifetime Achievement Award for Gujarati Theatre in 2007 by Transmedia (Organization felicitating artist on Gujarati Theatre & TV)
 Mumbai Nagar Palika – Gold Medal
 Marathi Natya Parishad – 1988
 Maharashtra Gaurav Puraskar – 1990
 Bank of India- Utkrushta Puraskar – 1997–98
 Indo-American Society Award for Excellence – 1998
 Gujarat Government Award – 1998
 Bruhad Mumbai Gujarati Samaj – 2000
 National School of Drama – (Delhi 2001)
 RAPA Award – 2008
 Jeevan Gaurav Puraskar – 2010

References

External links

Indian television actresses
Indian film actresses
Actresses in Hindi cinema
Indian soap opera actresses
Living people
Indian stage actresses
1943 births
Gujarati theatre
Recipients of the Sangeet Natak Akademi Award
20th-century Indian actresses
21st-century Indian actresses
Actresses in Hindi television
Recipients of the Padma Shri in arts